J.J. Holland Park is a large multi-use park in the Melbourne suburb of Kensington. It is named after John Joseph Holland (1877–1955), who was the Member of the Legislative Assembly for Flemington for over 30 years from 1925.

The park is  freehold land owned by the City of Melbourne, covers approximately 10 hectares, and is triangular shaped.

Parks in Melbourne
City of Melbourne